The county of Staffordshire is divided into nine districts. The districts of Staffordshire are Tamworth, Lichfield, Cannock Chase, South Staffordshire, Stafford, Newcastle-under-Lyme, Staffordshire Moorlands, East Staffordshire, and Stoke-on-Trent.

As there are many Grade II* listed buildings in the county they have been split into separate lists for each district.

 Grade II* listed buildings in Cannock Chase (district)
 Grade II* listed buildings in East Staffordshire
 Grade II* listed buildings in Lichfield (district)
 Grade II* listed buildings in Newcastle-under-Lyme (borough)
 Grade II* listed buildings in South Staffordshire
 Grade II* listed buildings in Stafford (borough)
 Grade II* listed buildings in Staffordshire Moorlands
 Grade II* listed buildings in Stoke-on-Trent
 Grade II* listed buildings in Tamworth (borough)

See also
 Grade I listed buildings in Staffordshire
 :Category:Grade II* listed buildings in Staffordshire

References
National Heritage List for England

 
Staffordshire